Go Bang! is the sixth studio album by Shriekback, released in 1988. It produced a significant number of Billboard modern rock hits, including "Get Down Tonight," "Intoxication," and "Shark Walk". Released after the departure of founding member and bassist, Dave Allen, the album revolves around Barry Andrews.

The band was under considerable pressure from Island Records to produce a hit from this album and British hitmaker Richard James Burgess was brought in to produce and mix the album. The album is significantly more commercial than the previous or subsequent albums and this caused some tension in the studio. However, it produced the necessary hits, including lead single "Intoxication", which peaked at #6 on the newly introduced Modern Rock Tracks chart. "Get Down Tonight", a cover of the KC and the Sunshine Band track, spent 6 weeks in the Billboard Dance/Club chart, peaking at #20. The album sold well but unfortunately Joel Webber who was the A&R man at Island, died shortly before the album was released.

Andrews returned to a more traditional Shriekback sound with 1992's Sacred City.

Track listing
All songs written by Shriekback (Barry Andrews, Martyn Barker, Michael Cozzi, Sarah Partridge, Wendy Partridge), except where noted.

Personnel
Credits adapted from the Go Bang! media notes.

Shriekback
Barry Andrews - keyboards, vocals
Martyn Barker - drums, percussion, programming
Michael Cozzi - guitar
Sarah Partridge - backing vocals
Wendy Partridge - backing vocals

Production
Richard James Burgess - producer, engineer, mixing, programming
Stuart Bruce - engineer
Alex Dee - assistant engineer

Imagery
Stylorouge – design/art direction
Simon Fowler – photography

References 

1988 albums
Shriekback albums
Island Records albums